Brett Woods (born 4 April 1963) is an Australian former soccer player who played as a defender.

Career
Woods played his club football for Sydney City and Sydney United in the National Soccer League.

In 1981, he played one match for Australia against Indonesia.

References

1963 births
Living people
Australian soccer players
Association football defenders
Australia international soccer players
Sydney City players
Sydney United 58 FC players